The 2016 season is Stabæk's third season back in the Tippeligaen following their relegation in 2012, their 20th season in the top flight of Norwegian football. Stabæk finished the previous season in third place, qualifying for the 2016–17 UEFA Europa League First qualifying round.

Season Events
Billy McKinlay resigned as manager on 8 July 2016, after being knocked out of the UEFA Europa League by Connah's Quay Nomads.

Squad

Out on loan 

For season transfers, see List of Norwegian football transfers winter 2014–15 and List of Norwegian football transfers summer 2015.

Transfers

Winter

In:

Out:

Summer

In:

Out:

Friendlies

Competitions

Tippeligaen

Results summary

Results by round

Results

Table

Relegation play-offs

Norwegian Cup

UEFA Europa League

Qualifying rounds

Squad statistics

Appearances and goals

|-
|colspan="14"|Players away from Stabæk on loan:
|-
|colspan="14"|Players who appeared for Stabæk no longer at the club:

|}

Goal scorers

Disciplinary record

Notes

References

Stabæk Fotball seasons
Stabaek